Geikristlaste Kogu, GK in short, is an Estonian LGBT rights organization of gays and lesbians who are active Christians.

Founded on August 11, 2010, in Tallinn, Estonia, Geikristlaste Kogu is a religiously and politically independent non-governmental organization of homosexual Christians working for equal treatment and opportunities for sexual minorities in society and religious organizations. It supports spiritual and personal growth of individuals along with their mental and physical healing, while developing community life and offering reliable information about Christianity and sexual orientation. Since its foundation GK has been co-chaired by Heino Nurk and Meelis Süld.

Its first public event was a Christmas celebration held at X-Baar in Tallinn, on December 11, 2010.

Normal activities of GK include commentaries about pertinent news conveyed in its website and devotionals and networking centered in its Facebook page, particularly translations of daily devotionals by Chris Glaser. Members have also published some articles in mainline press such as: The Church should support gay marriage, Can a Christian be Gay?, and Hostility toward gays does not protect families  
     
Internationally, since May 2011 GK has been a member of the European Forum of Lesbian, Gay, Bisexual and Transgender Christian Groups.

Meetings are held every Sunday at 12:00 hours at OMA Keskus in Tallinn.

See also

List of LGBT rights organizations

References

External links

Facebook page

Christianity in Estonia
LGBT political advocacy groups in Estonia
LGBT Christian organizations
2010 establishments in Estonia